Nikos Georgiou Nikolaidis (25 October 1939 – 5 September 2007) was a Greek film director, screenwriter, film producer, writer, theatre director, assistant director, record producer, television director, and commercial director. He is usually considered a representative of European avant-garde and experimental art film.

Biography
Nikolaidis was born on 25 October 1939 in Athens, Greece, where he lived and worked all his life. He was also the scriptwriter and producer of the movies which he directed and would occasionally, as in the case of the 1965 Orestis Laskos film Praktores 005 enantion Hrysopodarou, write screenplays for other directors. For much of his life he worked in advertising and he managed to direct two hundred television advertisements within twenty years. In 1960 he began to work as a first assistant director for Vasilis Georgiadis and in 1962 he directed his first short film Lacrimae Rerum. His directorial feature-length debut was Euridice BA 2037 which premiered at the Thessaloniki Festival of Greek Cinema on 29 September 1975 where it won the Best Director Award, the Greek National Ministry of Culture Award, and the Athens Film Critics Association Best Picture Award. Despite a lukewarm reaction by viewers, critics appreciated the innovative perspective on the classic Greek tragedy of Orpheus and Eurydice and noted the originality of Nikolaidis' artistic techniques. Nikolaidis himself believed Euridice BA 2037 to be his best film.

For his next picture, The Wretches Are Still Singing (1979), the director studied the transformation of social values using the example of a group of five friends who meet after a long separation and share with each other the details of their difficult lives. The film became the symbol of the 1950s generation and reflected his personal views on the problem of alienation in the modern world. The film was shot in a surreal way with a predilection for the aesthetics of the Marquis de Sade. In it, for the first time in Nikolaidis' filmography, one can see the characteristic elements of film noir which became part and parcel of Nikolaidis' unique approach in the majority of the films that followed. Today he is probably best known for his 1990 magnum opus Singapore Sling, a bizarre mix of film noir and horror with sex being used as a power game. Despite his long career as a film director in his home country which stretches to the early 1960s he was almost entirely unknown outside Greece before the early 1990s and is still less known outside it and it was only with this film, which has immediately achieved cult status, that international fame came to him. From his cinematic works, he further directed Sweet Bunch (1983), Morning Patrol (1987), See You in Hell, My Darling (1999), and The Loser Takes It All (2002). He also published a collection of short stories and wrote three novels, including The Angry Balkan (1977) which has been reprinted many times in Greece. In addition to his career as a filmmaker, theatre director, and writer, Nikolaidis also worked at a recording studio.

His films have often divided viewers and critics alike. Due to his methods of filmmaking, screenwriting, et cetera, as well as the themes his films usually deal with, being in stark contrast to standard mainstream ones, his films have received very little publicity though some, especially his lesser known ones, became cult films, both inside and outside Greece. The characters in his films are usually people constrained by limitations or found in absurd and extreme situations while playing with their fate. The themes that one often encounters in his films include the 1950s and film noir, the relationship between sex and death, companionship and love, as well as the struggle against all sorts of powers and ghosts from the past. Nikolaidis filmed much of his work in black and white, a few of his films contained a certain similarity to so-called "trash films," and he categorized the majority of his films into trilogies. As an example of the last tendency, the "Years of Cholera" trilogy which deals with the last decades of the twentieth century begins with The Wretches Are Still Singing (1979), continues with Sweet Bunch (1983), and ends with The Loser Takes It All (2002).

In November 2005, after the completion of his last film The Zero Years, a tale of perversion and sexual dominance which failed to replicate the earlier success of Singapore Sling (1990), Nikolaidis declared his intention to stop making movies in order to deal with music.

From 1970 on, he lived with Marie-Louise Bartholomew with whom he had two children. She was also either the producer or at least involved in the production of all his eight feature films and two hundred advertisements.

He died on 5 September 2007, aged 67, of pulmonary edema in Athens, Greece. The Thessaloniki International Film Festival held a retrospective in his honor during its tribute program in November 2007 and the Greek Film Archive paid tribute to him between 26 May and 1 June 2011 by projecting his eight feature films. To this day he remains the only Greek filmmaker who was ever awarded the Best Director Award at the Thessaloniki Festival of Greek Cinema or at the Thessaloniki International Film Festival's Greek State Film Awards five times.

Legacy
The work of Nikos Nikolaidis has had a significant influence on the subsequent generation of Greek filmmakers some of which were inspired by the stylistics of his films and the unusual artistic images containing complex allegories and symbols. His films' protagonists are usually outcasts and nonconformists or the cynics and the marginalized people of society with mental and sexual disorders. The main feature of Nikolaidis' directorial approach was the predominance of form over content. At home, he was seen as an innovator looking for unusual ways to use film language, as well as someone who created a unique aesthetic combining beauty and ugliness. Abroad, Nikolaidis earned a reputation as an eccentric and controversial director. His influence extends abroad too. Ihor Podolchak's 2013 film Delirium was compared by Ukrainian film critics to the works of Nikolaidis after its prerelease screenings.

Filmography
Lacrimae Rerum (Latin: Tears of Things) (1962, Short Film)
Anev Oron (Άνευ Όρων – Unconditionally) (1968, Short Film)
Euridice BA 2037 (Ευριδίκη ΒΑ 2037) (1975, Feature Film)
Ta Kourelia Tragoudane Akoma... (Τα Κουρέλια Τραγουδάνε Ακόμα... – The Wretches Are Still Singing) (1979, Feature Film)
Glykia Symmoria (Γλυκιά Συμμορία – Sweet Bunch) (1983, Feature Film)
Proini Peripolos (Πρωϊνή Περίπολος – Morning Patrol) (1987, Feature Film)
Singapore Sling: O Anthropos pou Agapise ena Ptoma (Singapore Sling: Ο Άνθρωπος που Αγάπησε ένα Πτώμα – Singapore Sling) (1990, Feature Film)
To koritsi me tis valitses (Το κορίτσι με τις βαλίτσες – Girl with Suitcases) (1994, Television Film)
Nikolaidis used to characterize this television film as "a mistake" for the following reason: "Mistakes are like failed love affairs – you reminisce about them, tortured by the fact that they were never fulfilled, but you wouldn't ever wish to relive them again... Bearing the reality, that the televised screening of this 'mistake' movie, received a viewing of 57.6%, only proves how big my mistake was."
Tha se Do stin Kolasi Agapi mou (Θα σε Δω στην Κόλαση Αγάπη μου – See You in Hell, My Darling) (1999, Feature Film)
O chamenos ta pairnei ola (Ο χαμένος τα παίρνει όλα – The Loser Takes It All) (2002, Feature Film)
The Zero Years (2005, Feature Film)

Bibliography
Oi tymvorychoi: Diigimata 1962–1965 (Οι τυμβωρύχοι: Διηγήματα 1962–1965 – The Gravediggers: Short Stories 1962–1965) (Αθήνα: Ιδιωτική Έκδοση, 1966) 
O orgismenos Valkanios: Mythistorima (Ο οργισμένος Βαλκάνιος: Μυθιστόρημα – The Angry Balkan: A Novel) (Αθήνα: Εκδόσεις Κέδρος, 1977) 
Ta Kourelia Tragoudane Akoma...: Senario (Τα Κουρέλια Τραγουδάνε Ακόμα...: Σενάριο – The Wretches Are Still Singing: A Screenplay) (Αθήνα: Εκδόσεις Γνώση, 1980) 
Glykia Symmoria: Senario (Γλυκιά Συμμορία: Σενάριο – Sweet Bunch: A Screenplay) (Αθήνα: Συντεχνία, 1984) 
Gourounia ston Anemo: Mythistorima (Γουρούνια στον Άνεμο: Μυθιστόρημα – Pigs in the Wind: A Novel) (Αθήνα: Εκδόσεις Καστανιōτη, 1992) 
O chamenos ta pairnei ola: Senario (Ο χαμένος τα παίρνει όλα: Σενάριο – The Loser Takes It All: A Screenplay) (Αθήνα: Εκδόσεις Αιγόκερως, 2003) 
 (Ο Συμεών στον Άδη: Νουβέλα) (Ανέκδοτη)
 (Ιούλιος: Νουβέλα) (Ανέκδοτη)

Posthumous
Mia stekia sto mati tou Montezouma: Mythistorima (Μιά στεκιά στό μάτι τού Μοντεζούμα: Μυθιστόρημα – A Hit in the Eye of Montezuma: A Novel) (New York City: Greek Works, 2008)

Awards
Best Director Award, Greek National Ministry of Culture Award, Athens Film Critics Association Best Picture Award, Thessaloniki Festival of Greek Cinema, September 1975 (Euridice BA 2037)
Best Director Award, Athens Film Critics Association Best Picture Award, Thessaloniki Festival of Greek Cinema, September 1979 (The Wretches Are Still Singing)
Athens Film Critics Association Best Picture Award, Thessaloniki Festival of Greek Cinema, October 1983 (Sweet Bunch)
Best Director Award, Greek National Ministry of Culture Award, Thessaloniki Festival of Greek Cinema, October 1987 (Morning Patrol)
Best Director Award, Best Quality Film Award, Thessaloniki Festival of Greek Cinema, October 1990 (Singapore Sling)
Best Director Award, Thessaloniki International Film Festival's Greek State Film Awards, November 2002 (The Loser Takes It All)

References

Further reading
Alexandros Moumtzis, "Le Nouveau face à l'Ancien (Pandelis Voulgaris, Nikos Panayotopoulos, Nikos Nikolaïdis)," dans Michel Démopoulos (directeur de publication), Le Cinéma grec, Paris, Centre Georges Pompidou, collection "cinéma/pluriel," 1995, 263 pages.

External links
Nikos Nikolaidis (Film Director/Writer/Producer)

5 Books, 6 Films, and... Nikos Nikolaidis
Nikos Nikolaidis at the TCM Movie Database

Νίκος Νικολαΐδης (1939–2007) at Comic Orange: Comic Orange, Movies 
Νίκος Νικολαΐδης (1939–2007)/Nikos Nikolaidis at Cinematografía en Grecia 

1939 births
2007 deaths
20th-century Greek writers
20th-century novelists
20th-century short story writers
21st-century Greek writers
21st-century novelists
21st-century short story writers
English-language film directors
French-language film directors
Greek experimental filmmakers
Greek film producers
Greek male short story writers
Greek short story writers
Greek novelists
Greek record producers
Greek screenwriters
Greek theatre directors
Male novelists
Film people from Athens
Television commercial directors
20th-century Greek male writers
21st-century Greek male writers
20th-century screenwriters
Respiratory disease deaths in Greece
Deaths from pulmonary edema